The Texas A&M University College of Science was the science college of Texas A&M University in College Station.  The faculty includes a Nobel laureate and three National Academy of Sciences members.  In 2006, the faculty collected a combined $38.5 million in peer-reviewed federal funding, and annually generates over $5 million in indirect cost return for Texas A&M.

The Chemistry Department ranks 15th nationally in the National Research Council rankings, the highest ranking of any Texas A&M department, and ranks as the seventh-largest chemistry department in research and development expenditures among all American universities. The Department of Mathematics ranks 13th nationally among other public university Mathematics departments in research funding, and is one of only five nationwide that has both Vertical Integration of Research and Education in the Mathematical Sciences (VIGRE) and Research Experiences for Undergraduates (REU) National Science Foundation grants.  The Mathematics Departments also offers one of the nation's only fully online master's degrees in mathematics.  The Physics Department is one of eight partners in the $500 million Giant Magellan Telescope.

In 2022, the College of Science merged with the College of Liberal Arts and the College of Geosciences, along with a few other programs, to form the College of Arts & Sciences.

History

When Texas A&M was founded as a land-grant agricultural college in 1876, the school consisted of only two faculty, one of whom taught agricultural chemistry and scientific agriculture.  The Texas State Legislature had mandated that science and mathematics existed only to supply instruction to applied fields, and pure scientific study or research was not encouraged.  It was not until 1924 that the college established a School of Arts and Sciences, which taught liberal arts, business administration, preparation for teaching, and science.  Courses in chemistry and physics were offered in the School of Engineering.

Following World War II and the advent of the atomic bomb, more students clamored for training in pure and natural sciences versus applied science.  In 1944 the college had established the Texas A&M Research Foundation, further encourage scientifically minded young people to attend A&M.   Between 1948 and 1958 the proportion of students in the School of Arts and Sciences grew much more rapidly than those in the Schools of Agriculture and Engineering, and by 1957 comprised 25% of the student body.

Texas A&M was elevated to university status in 1963, and three years later the College of Science was born, offering the departments of biology, chemistry, mathematics, and physics.  The Cyclotron Institute, which conducts research in the nuclear aspects of chemistry, physics, biology, and engineering was placed under the administration of the College of Science in 1971, and in 1984 the Institute of Statistics was renamed to the Department of Statistics. In 2009, the Department of Physics became the Department of Physics and Astronomy to reflect the membership in the Giant Magellan Telescope Project in 2004, and  the inclusion of an Astronomy Program in 2006.

The Trotter Prize (Texas A&M) is an award and lecture series.

Academics

Degrees offered
Department of Biology
Biology (BA, BS, MS, Ph.D.)
Botany (BS, MS, Ph.D.)
Microbiology (BS, MS, Ph.D.)
Molecular & Cell Biology (BS)
Zoology (BS, MS, Ph.D.)
Neuroscience (BS, BA)
Department of Chemistry
Chemistry (BA, BS, MS, Ph.D.)
Department of Mathematics
Applied Mathematical Sciences (BS)
Mathematics (BA, BS, MS, Ph.D.)
Department of Physics and Astronomy
Applied Physics (Ph.D.)
Physics (BA, BS, MS, Ph.D.)
Astrophysics (Ph.D.)
Department of Statistics
Statistics (BS, MS, Ph.D.)

Centers
Center for Approximation Theory
Center for Biological Clocks Research
Center for Chemical Characterization & Analysis
Center for Mathematics & Science Education (CMSE)
Information Technology in Science (ITS)
Center for Teaching & Learning

Institutes
Cyclotron Institute
George P. and Cynthia W. Mitchell Institute for Fundamental Physics
Institute of Developmental & Molecular Biology (IDMB)

Rankings
The Texas A&M Department of Chemistry is ranked 21st nationally by U.S. News & World Report, and the department's Division of Inorganic Chemistry is ranked 7th.

References

External links
College of Science Home Page
Texas A&M University Home Page
Texas A&M University Map

Science
College Station, Texas
Educational institutions established in 1966
1966 establishments in Texas